The 1976 Women's Hockey World Cup was the second edition of the Women's Hockey World Cup. It took place from 22 to 30 May in West Berlin. West Germany won the title defeating Argentina in the final on 30 May.

Tournament

Pool A

Group table

Results

Pool B

Group table

Results

Semi-finals

Third and fourth place

Final

Winning Squad

References

1976
International women's field hockey competitions hosted by Germany
1976 in German women's sport
May 1976 sports events in Europe
1976 in women's field hockey
1970s in West Berlin
Sports competitions in West Berlin